Kesu may refer to:

Places
Kesu, Lääne County, village in Martna Parish, Lääne County, Estonia
Kesu, Rapla County, village in Vigala Parish, Rapla County, Estonia

Other uses
 Kesu (film), an Indian children's film released in 2010.
 Kesu, the mascot for the Kerala Blasters football club
 KESU-LP, a low-power radio station (94.9 FM) licensed to serve Lihue, Hawaii, United States
 KESU-LP (Hanamaulu, Hawaii), a defunct low-power television station (channel 6) formerly licensed to serve Hanamaulu, Hawaii